Edward Phelps may refer to:
 Edward H. Phelps (1829–1863), officer in the Union Army during the American Civil War
 Edward John Phelps (1822–1900), American lawyer and diplomat
 Edward Johnson Phelps (1863–1938), president Northern Trust Safe Deposit Company
 Ed Phelps (1879–1942), American Major League Baseball player
 Edward Phelps (mayor) (1861–1931), businessman and politician; mayor of Laurel, Maryland, 1895–1902
 Edward Elisha Phelps (1803–1880), American physician